Fauquier High School is a public high school in Warrenton, Virginia, United States. The school is part of Fauquier County Public Schools and is located at 705 Waterloo Road.

History
Fauquier opened in 1963 and is the oldest high school in Fauquier County. The county was primarily a rural area, but has experienced a high rate of growth since the 1990s, which led to Liberty High School's opening in 1994, and Kettle Run High School's opening in the fall of 2008. 

In 2015 the school had 1,200 students.

References

External links
 Fauquier High School's official website
 Fauquier's official sports website
 Fauquier's official Band website
 Fauquier County Public Schools website

Public high schools in Virginia
Schools in Fauquier County, Virginia
Educational institutions established in 1963
1963 establishments in Virginia